Tömöriin Artag (born April 10, 1943, died 1993) was a Mongolian wrestler. At the 1968 Summer Olympics he won the bronze medal in the men's Freestyle Welterweight category.

References

 sports-reference.com: Tömöriin Artag

External links
 

1943 births
1993 deaths
People from Uvs Province
Wrestlers at the 1968 Summer Olympics
Wrestlers at the 1972 Summer Olympics
Mongolian male sport wrestlers
Olympic wrestlers of Mongolia
Olympic bronze medalists for Mongolia
Olympic medalists in wrestling
Medalists at the 1968 Summer Olympics
20th-century Mongolian people